The 2005 Interprovincial Hurling Championship was the 78th staging of the Interprovincial Championship since its establishment by the Gaelic Athletic Association in 1927. The championship began on 23 October 2005 and ended on 6 November 2005.

Connacht were the defending champions, however, they were beaten by Leinster in the semi-final.

On 6 November 2005, Munster won the championship following a 1-21 to 2-14 defeat of Leinster in the final at Boston. This was their 43rd championship title overall and their first title since 2001.

Leinster's James Young was the championship's top scorer with 0-19.

Results

Semi-finals

Final

Scoring statistics

Top scorers overall

References

Railway Cup Hurling Championship
Railway Cup Hurling Championship